Uttoxeter Town F.C. is an English football club based in Uttoxeter, Staffordshire. The club is a FA Charter Standard Club affiliated to the Staffordshire Football Association.

History
The club was formed in 1972 when they split from Uttoxeter Amateurs after a disagreement on the clubs location. The club joined the North Premier Division of the Staffordshire County League. In the late 1970s the club stopped playing Saturday football and switched over to Sunday league football.

About 30 years later the club switched back to Saturday football and joined the Staffordshire County Senior League. The 2012–13 season saw the club win Division one of the league. The 2014–15 season saw the become one of the founding members of the Midland Football League, joining division one. Despite finishing fifth in the division, the club dropped back down to the Staffordshire County Senior League for financial reasons. In their first season in the Staffordshire County Senior League the club entered the FA Vase for the first time, progressing to the third round before being eliminated by Coleshill Town. The prize money they earned from their FA Vase cup exploits enabled them to overcome their financial issues and they rejoined Division one of the Midlands league the following season.

In 2021 Uttoxeter were promoted to the Premier Division based on their results in the abandoned 2019–20 and 2020–21 seasons.

Ground

The club play their home games at the Oldfield Sports Club.

Honours
Staffordshire County Senior League
 Division One Champions (1) 2012–13
 Presidents Trophy Winners (1) 2012–13

References

External links

Football clubs in Staffordshire
Midland Football League
Football clubs in England
Uttoxeter
Staffordshire County Senior League